The Indianapolis Prize is a biennial prize awarded by the Indianapolis Zoo to individuals for "extraordinary contributions to conservation efforts" affecting one or more animal species.

Overview
The Indianapolis Prize was established by the Indianapolis Zoo to recognize and reward individuals who have achieved significant successes in the conservation of animal species.

Every two years, nominations of deserving individuals for the Indianapolis Prize are accepted. From those nominations, a group of conservation experts from around the world select six finalists. A second group of conservation experts, aided by representatives from the Indianapolis Zoo and the city of Indianapolis, serve as jurors to review the work of the six finalists and select the winner.

From 2006 through 2012, winners received an unrestricted cash award of US$100,000, which was increased to US$250,000 for 2014 and subsequent years. In addition, beginning in 2014, the five other finalists each receive a US$10,000 unrestricted cash award.

Many renowned conservationists and scientists have served on the nominating committee and jury, including E.O. Wilson, John Terborgh, Peter Raven, and Stuart Pimm. New nominating committee and jury members are chosen each two-year prize cycle.

The Eli Lilly and Company Foundation provides funding for the prize. In addition to the US$250,000 award, the winner also receives the Lilly Medal. The obverse of the Lilly Medal features a shepherd surrounded by nature and the rising sun. On the reverse is inscribed a quote from naturalist John Muir, "When we try to pick out anything by itself, we find it hitched to everything else in the Universe."

Indianapolis Prize Gala 
The winner and finalists are celebrated at the Indianapolis Prize Gala held in downtown Indianapolis. It is designed to inspire guests to care more about animal conservation and place these dedicated heroes on the pedestal usually reserved for sports and entertainment stars.

Jane Alexander Global Wildlife Ambassador Award 
Additionally, the Indianapolis Prize created the Jane Alexander Global Wildlife Ambassador Award to recognize advocacy, outreach, and contributions of public figures who use their platform to support the natural world. The award is named in honor of actor and conservationist Jane Alexander, winners of the Ambassador award lend a credible public voice for the sustainability of wildlife.

The inaugural Jane Alexander Global Wildlife Ambassador Award was presented to its namesake in recognition of her decades-long commitment as a voice and champion for species. She has been involved with the Wildlife Conservation Society, the Audubon Society, and Panthera. 2016 Winner Sigourney Weaver has been an advocate for the mountain gorillas of Rwanda since her starring role in the 1988 film Gorillas in the Mist and serves as honorary chair of the Dian Fossey Gorilla Fund International. In 2018, Harrison Ford received the honor for his support of Conservation International, where he is on the Executive Committee and active in the organization's design and growth. In 2021, ocean conservationist and philanthropist Prince Albert II of Monaco received the honor for his dedication to protecting the world's oceans; he established the Prince Albert II of Monaco Foundation in 2006 to address the planet's alarming environmental situation. Under his leadership, Monaco is the official proponent for action by the Convention on International Trade in Endangered Species (CITES) on behalf of seahorses – a flagship species that is indicative of ocean health.

Indianapolis Prize winners

Indianapolis Prize finalists

See also

 List of environmental awards

References

External links
 

Nature conservation in the United States
Culture of Indianapolis
Environmental awards
Biology awards
American science and technology awards
Awards established in 2006